

Events

Pre-1600
1370 – Northern Crusades: Grand Duchy of Lithuania and the Teutonic Knights meet in the Battle of Rudau.
1411 – Following the successful campaigns during the Ottoman Interregnum, Musa Çelebi, one of the sons of Bayezid I, becomes Sultan of the Ottoman Empire with the support of Mircea I of Wallachia.
1500 – Duke Friedrich and Duke Johann attempt to subdue the peasantry of Dithmarschen, Denmark, in the Battle of Hemmingstedt.
1600 – On his way to be burned at the stake for heresy, at Campo de' Fiori in Rome, the philosopher Giordano Bruno has a wooden vise put on his tongue to prevent him continuing to speak.

1601–1900
1621 – Myles Standish is appointed as first military commander of the English Plymouth Colony in North America.
1674 – An earthquake strikes the Indonesian island of Ambon. It triggers a  megatsunami which drowns over 2,300 people.
1676 – Sixteen men of Pascual de Iriate's expedition are lost at Evangelistas Islets at the western end of the Strait of Magellan.
1739 – The Battle of Vasai commences as the Marathas move to invade Portuguese-occupied territory.
1753 – In Sweden February 17 is followed by March 1 as the country moves from the Julian calendar to the Gregorian calendar.
1801 – United States presidential election: A tie in the Electoral College between Thomas Jefferson and Aaron Burr is resolved when Jefferson is elected President of the United States and Burr Vice President by the United States House of Representatives.
1814 – War of the Sixth Coalition: The Battle of Mormant.
1819 – The United States House of Representatives passes the Missouri Compromise for the first time.
1838 – Weenen massacre: Hundreds of Voortrekkers along the Blaukraans River, Natal are killed by Zulus.
1854 – The United Kingdom recognizes the independence of the Orange Free State.
1859 – Cochinchina Campaign: The French Navy captures the Citadel of Saigon, a fortress manned by 1,000 Nguyễn dynasty soldiers, en route to conquering Saigon and other regions of southern Viet Nam.
1863 – A group of citizens of Geneva found an International Committee for Relief to the Wounded, which later became known as the International Committee of the Red Cross.
1865 – American Civil War: Columbia, South Carolina, is burned as Confederate forces flee from advancing Union forces.

1901–present
1913 – The Armory Show opens in New York City, displaying works of artists who are to become some of the most influential painters of the early 20th century.
1919 – The Ukrainian People's Republic asks the Entente and the United States for help fighting the Bolsheviks.
1944 – World War II: The Battle of Eniwetok begins. The battle ends in an American victory on February 22.
  1944   – World War II: Operation Hailstone begins: U.S. naval air, surface, and submarine attack against Truk Lagoon, Japan's main base in the central Pacific, in support of the Eniwetok invasion.
1949 – Chaim Weizmann begins his term as the first President of Israel.
1959 – Project Vanguard: Vanguard 2: The first weather satellite is launched to measure cloud-cover distribution.
  1959   – A Turkish Airlines Vickers Viscount crashes near Gatwick Airport, killing 14; Turkish prime minister Adnan Menderes survives the crash.
1964 – In Wesberry v. Sanders the Supreme Court of the United States rules that congressional districts have to be approximately equal in population.
  1964   – Gabonese president Léon M'ba is toppled by a coup and his rival, Jean-Hilaire Aubame, is installed in his place.
1965 – Project Ranger: The Ranger 8 probe launches on its mission to photograph the Mare Tranquillitatis region of the Moon in preparation for the manned Apollo missions. Mare Tranquillitatis or the "Sea of Tranquility" would become the site chosen for the Apollo 11 lunar landing.
1969 – American aquanaut Berry L. Cannon dies of carbon dioxide poisoning while attempting to repair a leak in the SEALAB III underwater habitat. The SEALAB project was subsequently abandoned.
1970 – Jeffrey R. MacDonald, United States Army captain, is charged with murder of his pregnant wife and two daughters.
1972 – Cumulative sales of the Volkswagen Beetle exceed those of the Ford Model T.
1974 – Robert K. Preston, a disgruntled U.S. Army private, buzzes the White House in a stolen helicopter.
1978 – The Troubles: The Provisional IRA detonates an incendiary bomb at the La Mon restaurant, near Belfast, killing 12 and seriously injuring 30 others, all Protestants.
1979 – The Sino-Vietnamese War begins.
1980 – First winter ascent of Mount Everest by Krzysztof Wielicki and Leszek Cichy.
1991 – Ryan International Airlines Flight 590 crashes during takeoff from Cleveland Hopkins International Airport, killing both pilots, the aircraft's only occupants.
1992 – First Nagorno-Karabakh War: Armenian troops massacre more than 20 Azerbaijani civilians during the Capture of Garadaghly.
1995 – The Cenepa War between Peru and Ecuador ends on a ceasefire brokered by the UN.
1996 – In Philadelphia, world champion Garry Kasparov beats the Deep Blue supercomputer in a chess match.
  1996   – NASA's Discovery Program begins as the NEAR Shoemaker spacecraft lifts off on the first mission ever to orbit and land on an asteroid, 433 Eros.
  1996   – The 8.2  Biak earthquake shakes the Papua province of eastern Indonesia with a maximum Mercalli intensity of VIII (Severe). A large tsunami followed, leaving one-hundred sixty-six people dead or missing and 423 injured.
2006 – A massive mudslide occurs in Southern Leyte, Philippines; the official death toll is set at 1,126.
2008 – Kosovo declares independence from Serbia.
2011 – Arab Spring: Libyan protests against Muammar Gaddafi's regime begin.
  2011   – Arab Spring: In Bahrain, security forces launch a deadly pre-dawn raid on protesters in Pearl Roundabout in Manama; the day is locally known as Bloody Thursday.
2015 – Eighteen people are killed and 78 injured in a stampede at a Mardi Gras parade in Haiti.
2016 – Military vehicles explode outside a Turkish Armed Forces barracks in Ankara, Turkey, killing at least 29 people and injuring 61 others.

Births

Pre-1600
 624 – Wu Zetian, Chinese empress consort (d. 705)
1028 – Al-Juwayni, Persian scholar and imam (d. 1085)
1490 – Charles III, duke of Bourbon (d. 1527)
1519 – Francis, French Grand Chamberlain (d. 1563)
1524 – Charles de Lorraine, French cardinal (d. 1574)

1601–1900
1646 – Pierre Le Pesant, sieur de Boisguilbert, French economist (d. 1714)
1653 – Arcangelo Corelli, Italian violinist and composer (d. 1713)
1723 – Tobias Mayer, German astronomer and academic (d. 1762)
1740 – Horace-Bénédict de Saussure, Swiss physicist and meteorologist (d. 1799)
1752 – Friedrich Maximilian Klinger, German author and playwright (d. 1831) 
1754 – Nicolas Baudin, French cartographer and explorer (d. 1803)
1758 – John Pinkerton, Scottish antiquarian, cartographer, author, numismatist and historian (d. 1826)
1762 – John Cooke, English captain (d. 1805)
1781 – René Laennec, French physician, invented the stethoscope (d. 1826)
1796 – Philipp Franz von Siebold, German physician and botanist (d. 1866)
1799 – Carl Julian (von) Graba, German lawyer and ornithologist who visited and studied the Faroe Islands (d. 1874)
1817 – Édouard Thilges, Luxembourgian jurist and politician, 7th Prime Minister of Luxembourg (d. 1904)
1820 – Henri Vieuxtemps, Belgian violinist and composer (d. 1881)
1821 – Lola Montez, Irish-American actress and dancer (d. 1861)
1832 – Richard Henry Park, American sculptor (d. 1902) 
1836 – Gustavo Adolfo Bécquer, Spanish author, poet, and playwright (d. 1870)
1843 – Aaron Montgomery Ward, American businessman, founded Montgomery Ward (d. 1913)
1848 – Louisa Lawson, Australian poet and publisher (d. 1920)
1854 – Friedrich Alfred Krupp, German businessman (d. 1902)
1861 – Helena of Waldeck and Pyrmont, duchess of Albany (d. 1922)
1862 – Mori Ōgai, Japanese general, author, and poet (d. 1922)
1864 – Jozef Murgaš, Slovak priest, botanist, and painter (d. 1929)
  1864   – Banjo Paterson, Australian journalist, author, and poet (d. 1941)
1874 – Thomas J. Watson, American businessman (d. 1956)
1877 – Isabelle Eberhardt, Swiss explorer and author (d. 1904)
  1877   – André Maginot, French sergeant and politician (d. 1932)
1879 – Dorothy Canfield Fisher, American educational reformer, social activist and author (d. 1958)
1881 – Mary Carson Breckinridge, American nurse midwife, founded Frontier Nursing Service (d. 1965)
1887 – Joseph Bech, Luxembourgian lawyer and politician, 15th Prime Minister of Luxembourg (d. 1975)
  1887   – Leevi Madetoja, Finnish composer and critic (d. 1947)
1888 – Otto Stern, German-American physicist and academic, Nobel Prize laureate (d. 1969)
1890 – Ronald Fisher, English-Australian statistician, biologist, and geneticist (d. 1962)
1891 – Abraham Fraenkel, German-Israeli mathematician and academic (d. 1965)
1893 – Wally Pipp, American baseball player and journalist (d. 1965)
1899 – Jibanananda Das, Bangladeshi-Indian poet and author (d. 1954)
1900 – Ruth Clifford, American actress (d. 1998)

1901–present
1903 – Sadegh Hedayat, Iranian-French author and translator (d. 1951)
1904 – Hans Morgenthau, German-American political scientist, philosopher, and academic (d. 1980)
1905 – Ruth Baldwin, British socialite (d. 1937)
  1905   – Rózsa Politzer, Hungarian mathematician (d. 1977)
1906 – Mary Brian, American actress (d. 2002) 
1908 – Bo Yibo, Chinese general and politician, Vice Premier of the People's Republic of China (d. 2007)
1910 – Marc Lawrence, American actor, director, producer, and screenwriter (d. 2005)
1911 – Oskar Seidlin, German-American author, poet, and scholar (d. 1984)
1912 – Andre Norton, American author (d. 2005)
1914 – Arthur Kennedy, American actor (d. 1990)
1916 – Alexander Obolensky, Russian rugby player and pilot (d. 1940)
  1916   – Don Tallon, Australian cricketer (d. 1984)
  1916   – Raf Vallone, Italian footballer and actor (d. 2002)
1918 – William Bronk, American poet and academic (d. 1999)
  1918   – Jacqueline Ferrand, French mathematician (d. 2014)
1919 – J. M. S. Careless, Canadian historian and academic (d. 2009)
  1919   – Kathleen Freeman, American actress and singer (d. 2001)
  1919   – Joe Hunt, American tennis player (d. 1945)
1920 – Ivo Caprino, Norwegian director and screenwriter (d. 2001)
  1920   – Annie Castor, American disability and communication disorder advocate (d. 2020)
  1920   – Curt Swan, American illustrator (d. 1996)
1921 – Duane Gish, American biochemist and academic (d. 2013)
1922 – Tommy Edwards, American R&B singer-songwriter (d. 1969)
1923 – Buddy DeFranco, American clarinet player and bandleader (d. 2014)
1924 – Margaret Truman, American singer and author (d. 2008)
1925 – Ron Goodwin, English composer and conductor (d. 2003)
  1925   – Hal Holbrook, American actor and director (d. 2021)
1928 – Marta Romero, Puerto Rican actress and singer (d. 2013)
  1928   – Michiaki Takahashi, Japanese virologist (d. 2013)
1929 – Alejandro Jodorowsky, Chilean-French director and screenwriter
  1929   – Chaim Potok, American rabbi and author (d. 2002)
  1929   – Nicholas Ridley, Baron Ridley of Liddesdale, English lieutenant and politician, Secretary of State for Business, Innovation and Skills (d. 1993)
  1929   – Patricia Routledge, English actress and singer
1930 – Roger Craig, American baseball player, coach, and manager
  1930   – Benjamin Fain, Ukrainian-Israeli physicist and academic (d. 2013)
  1930   – Ruth Rendell, English author (d. 2015)
1931 – Jiřina Jirásková, Czech actress and singer (d. 2013)
  1931   – Buddy Ryan, American football coach (d. 2016)
1933 – Craig L. Thomas, American captain and politician (d. 2007)
1934 – Sir Alan Bates, English actor (d. 2003)
  1934   – Barry Humphries (Dame Edna Everage), Australian comedian, actor, and author
1936 – Jim Brown, American football player and actor
1937 – Mary Ann Mobley, American model and actress, Miss America 1959 (d. 2014)
1940 – Vicente Fernández, Mexican singer-songwriter, actor, and producer (d. 2021)
  1940   – Gene Pitney, American singer-songwriter (d. 2006)
1941 – Julia McKenzie, English actress, singer, and director
1942 – Huey P. Newton, American activist, co-founded the Black Panther Party (d. 1989)
1944 – Karl Jenkins, Welsh saxophonist, keyboard player, and composer
1945 – Zina Bethune, American actress, dancer, and choreographer (d. 2012)
  1945   – Brenda Fricker, Irish actress
1946 – Shahrnush Parsipur, Iranian-American author and academic
1948 – José José, Mexican singer-songwriter, producer, and actor (d. 2019)
1949 – Fred Frith, English guitarist and songwriter
  1949   – Dennis Green, American football player and coach (d. 2016)
1951 – Rashid Minhas, Pakistani soldier and pilot (d. 1971)
1952 – Karin Büttner-Janz, German gymnast and physician
  1952   – Vladimír Padrůněk, Czech bass player (d. 1991)
1954 – Lou Ann Barton, American blues singer-songwriter
  1954   – Miki Berkovich, Israeli basketball player
  1954   – Rene Russo, American actress
1955 – Mo Yan, Chinese author and academic, Nobel Prize laureate
1956 – Richard Karn, American actor and game show host
1957 – Loreena McKennitt, Canadian singer-songwriter, accordion player, and pianist
1959 – Aryeh Deri, Moroccan-Israeli rabbi and politician, Israeli Minister of Internal Affairs
  1959   – Rowdy Gaines, American swimmer and sportscaster
1960 – Lindy Ruff, Canadian hockey player and coach
1961 – Angela Eagle, English politician, Shadow Leader of the House of Commons
  1961   – Maria Eagle, English politician, Shadow Secretary of State for Defence
  1961   – Andrey Korotayev, Russian anthropologist, historian, and sociologist
1962 – Lou Diamond Phillips, American actor and director
1963 – Larry the Cable Guy, American comedian and voice actor
  1963   – Alison Hargreaves, English mountaineer (d. 1995)
  1963   – Jen-Hsun Huang, Taiwanese-American businessman, co-founded Nvidia
  1963   – Michael Jordan, American basketball player and actor
1964 – Sherry Hawco, Canadian gymnast (d. 1991)
1965 – Michael Bay, American director and producer
  1965   – Danny Lee, Australian rugby league player
1966 – Luc Robitaille, Canadian ice hockey player, manager, and actor
1968 – Wu'erkaixi, Chinese journalist and activist
  1968   – Giuseppe Signori, Italian footballer  
1969 – David Douillet, French martial artist and politician
  1969   – Vasily Kudinov, Russian handball player (d. 2017)
1970 – Dominic Purcell, English-born Irish-Australian actor and producer
1971 – Denise Richards, American model and actress
1972 – Billie Joe Armstrong, American singer-songwriter, guitarist, actor, and producer
  1972   – Philippe Candeloro, French figure skater
  1972   – Taylor Hawkins, American singer-songwriter and drummer (d. 2022)
  1972   – Valeria Mazza, Argentinian model and businesswoman
  1972   – Lars-Göran Petrov, Swedish singer and drummer (d. 2021)
1973 – Goran Bunjevčević, Serbian FR Yugoslavia international footballer (d. 2018)
  1973   – Raphaël Ibañez, French rugby player
1974 – Kaoru, Japanese guitarist, songwriter, and producer 
  1974   – Jerry O'Connell, American actor, director, and producer
1975 – Václav Prospal, Czech ice hockey player
1978 – Rory Kinnear, English actor and playwright
1980 – Al Harrington, American basketball player
  1980   – Klemi Saban, Israeli footballer
1981 – Joseph Gordon-Levitt, American actor, director, and producer
  1981   – Paris Hilton, American model, media personality, actress, singer, DJ, author and businesswoman
  1981   – Pontus Segerström, Swedish footballer (d. 2014)
1982 – Adriano, Brazilian footballer
  1982   – Brian Bruney, American baseball player
1983 – Kevin Rudolf, American singer-songwriter, guitarist, and producer
1984 – AB de Villiers, South African cricketer
  1984   – Katie Hill, Australian 3.0 point wheelchair basketball player
  1984   – Marcin Gortat, Polish basketball player
1985 – Anders Jacobsen, Norwegian ski jumper
1987 – Ísis Valverde, Brazilian actress
1988 – Vasyl Lomachenko, Ukrainian boxer
1989 – Rebecca Adlington, English swimmer
  1989   – Chord Overstreet, American actor and singer
1990 – Marianne St-Gelais, Canadian speed skater
1991 – Ed Sheeran, English singer-songwriter, guitarist, and producer
  1991   – Bonnie Wright, English actress, filmmaker, and activist
1993 – Nicola Leali, Italian footballer
  1993   – Marc Márquez, Spanish motorcycle racer
1997 – Madison Keys, American tennis player

Deaths

Pre-1600
 364 – Jovian, Roman emperor (b. 331)
 440 – Mesrop Mashtots, Armenian monk, linguist, and theologian (b. 360)
 923 – Al-Tabari, Persian scholar (b. 839)
1178 – Evermode of Ratzeburg, bishop of Ratzeburg
1220 – Theobald I, Duke of Lorraine
1339 – Otto, Duke of Austria (b. 1301)
1371 – Ivan Alexander of Bulgaria
1500 – Adolph, Count of Oldenburg-Delmenhorst, German noble (b. before 1463)
1600 – Giordano Bruno, Italian mathematician, astronomer, and philosopher (b. 1548)

1601–1900
1609 – Ferdinando I de' Medici, Grand Duke of Tuscany (b. 1549)
1624 – Juan de Mariana, Spanish priest and historian (b. 1536)
1659 – Abel Servien, French politician, French Minister of Finance (b. 1593)
1673 – Molière, French actor and playwright (b. 1622)
1680 – Denzil Holles, 1st Baron Holles, English politician (b. 1599)
  1680   – Jan Swammerdam, Dutch biologist, zoologist, and entomologist (b. 1637)
1715 – Antoine Galland, French orientalist and archaeologist (b. 1646)
1732 – Louis Marchand, French organist and composer (b. 1669)
1768 – Arthur Onslow, English lawyer and politician, Speaker of the House of Commons (b. 1691)
1841 – Ferdinando Carulli, Italian guitarist and composer (b. 1770)
1849 – María de las Mercedes Barbudo, Puerto Rican political activist, the first woman Independentista in the island (b. 1773)
1854 – John Martin, English painter, engraver, and illustrator (b. 1789)
1856 – Heinrich Heine, German journalist and poet (b. 1797)
1874 – Adolphe Quetelet, Belgian astronomer, mathematician, and sociologist (b. 1796)
1890 – Christopher Latham Sholes, American publisher and politician (b. 1819)

1901–present
1905 – William Bickerton, English-American religious leader, leader in the Latter Day Saint movement (b. 1815)
1909 – Geronimo, American tribal leader (b. 1829)
1912 – Edgar Evans, Welsh sailor and explorer (b. 1876)
1919 – Wilfrid Laurier, Canadian lawyer and politician, 7th Prime Minister of Canada (b. 1841)
1924 – Oskar Merikanto, Finnish composer (b. 1868)
1934 – Albert I of Belgium (b. 1875)
  1934   – Siegbert Tarrasch, German chess player and theoretician (b. 1862)
1939 – Willy Hess, German violinist and educator (b. 1859)
1946 – Dorothy Gibson, American actress and singer (b. 1889)
1961 – Lütfi Kırdar, Turkish physician and politician, Turkish Minister of Health (b. 1887)
  1961   – Nita Naldi, American actress (b. 1894)
1962 – Joseph Kearns, American actor (b. 1907)
  1962   – Bruno Walter, German-American pianist, composer, and conductor (b. 1876)
1966 – Hans Hofmann, German-American painter (b. 1880)
1969 – Berry L. Cannon, American aquanaut (b. 1935)
1970 – Shmuel Yosef Agnon, Ukrainian-Israeli novelist, short story writer, and poet, Nobel Prize laureate (b. 1888)
  1970   – Alfred Newman, American composer and conductor (b. 1900)
1972 – Friday Hassler, American race car driver (b. 1935)
1977 – Janani Luwum, Ugandan archbishop and saint (b. 1922)
1979 – William Gargan, American actor (b. 1905)
1982 – Nestor Chylak, American baseball player and umpire (b. 1922)
  1982   – Thelonious Monk, American pianist and composer (b. 1917)
  1982   – Lee Strasberg, American actor and director (b. 1901)
1986 – Jiddu Krishnamurti, Indian-American philosopher and author (b. 1895)
1988 – John M. Allegro, English archaeologist and scholar (b. 1923)
  1988   – Karpoori Thakur, Indian educator and politician, 11th Chief Minister of Bihar (b. 1924)
1989 – Lefty Gomez, American baseball player (b. 1908)
1990 – Jean-Marc Boivin, French mountaineer, skier, and pilot (b. 1951)
1994 – Randy Shilts, American journalist and author (b. 1951)
1998 – Ernst Jünger, German soldier, philosopher, and author (b. 1895)
2003 – Steve Bechler, American baseball player (b. 1979)
2004 – José López Portillo, Mexican lawyer and politician, 51st President of Mexico (b. 1920)
2005 – Dan O'Herlihy, Irish-American actor (b. 1919)
  2005   – Omar Sívori, Argentinian footballer and manager (b. 1935)
2006 – Ray Barretto, American drummer (b. 1929)
  2006   – Bill Cowsill, American singer-songwriter and guitarist (b. 1948)
2009 – Conchita Cintrón, Chilean bullfighter and journalist (b. 1922)
2010 – Kathryn Grayson, American actress and singer (b. 1922)
2012 – Robert Carr, English engineer and politician, Shadow Chancellor of the Exchequer (b. 1916)
  2012   – Michael Davis, American singer-songwriter and bass player (b. 1943)
  2012   – Nicolaas Govert de Bruijn, Dutch mathematician and theorist (b. 1918)
  2012   – Ulric Neisser, German-American psychologist and academic (b. 1928)
2013 – Richard Briers, English actor (b. 1934)
  2013   – Shmulik Kraus, Israeli singer-songwriter and actor (b. 1935)
  2013   – Sophie Kurys, American baseball player (b. 1925)
  2013   – Mindy McCready, American singer-songwriter (b. 1975)
2014 – Bob Casale, American guitarist, keyboard player, and producer (b. 1952)
  2014   – Peter Florin, German politician and diplomat, President of the United Nations General Assembly (b. 1921)
  2014   – Wayne Smith, Jamaican singer (b. 1965)
2015 – John Barrow, American-Canadian football player and manager (b. 1935)
  2015   – Cathy Ubels-Veen, Dutch politician (b. 1928)
  2015   – Liu Yudi, Chinese general and pilot (b. 1923)
2016 – Andy Ganteaume, Trinidadian cricketer (b. 1921)
  2016   – Mohamed Hassanein Heikal, Egyptian journalist (b. 1923)
  2016   – Claude Jeancolas, French historian, author, and journalist (b. 1949)
  2016   – Tony Phillips, American baseball player (b. 1959)
  2016   – Andrzej Żuławski, Polish film director (b. 1940)
2017 – Robert H. Michel, American politician (b. 1923)
  2017   – Michael Novak, American Roman Catholic theologian (b. 1933)
2021 – Rush Limbaugh, American talk show host and author (b. 1951)
  2021   – Seif Sharif Hamad, Tanzanian politician (b. 1943)

Holidays and observances
Christian feast day:
Seven Founders of the Servite Order
Alexis Falconieri
Constabilis
Donatus, Romulus, Secundian, and Companions
Fintan of Clonenagh
Janani Luwum (Anglican Communion)
Lommán of Trim
February 17 (Eastern Orthodox liturgics)
Independence Day, celebrates the independence declaration of Kosovo in 2008, still partially recognized.
Revolution Day (Libya)

References

External links

 BBC: On This Day
 
 Historical Events on February 17

Days of the year
February